Coleophora rectimarginalis is a moth of the family Coleophoridae. It is found in Heilongjiang, China and in Korea.

References

rectimarginalis
Moths of Asia
Moths described in 2004